XHXV-FM 88.9/XEXV-AM 1300 is a combo radio station based in León, Guanajuato, with FM transmitter in León, AM transmitter in Arroyo Seco, and listed location of Tierra Blanca. It is owned by Grupo Radiorama.

History
XEXV received its concession on May 12, 1972. It was owned by Jaime Robledo Romero, who would later become Engineering Director of the Cámara Nacional de la Industria de Radio y Televisión (CIRT). The original station concession specified a location in San Francisco del Rincón. By the 1990s, it was an AM-FM combo owned by Fomento Radiofónico del Centro, which sold the station to Radiodifusoras Capital in 2006. In 2008, Capital sold XEXV/XHXV to Grupo Radiodigital Siglo XXI, a predecessor to Grupo Radio México.

In January 2022, ended its owned by Grupo Radio Centro, eliminating grupera as La Z, Radiorama took over XEXV/XHXV.

In September 2022, XHXV scrapped the La Nueva format. Switching to pop music like Radar, format based on XHQRO-FM

References

Radio stations in Guanajuato
Radio stations established in 1972